New men is a term referring to various groups of the socially upwardly mobile in England during the House of Lancaster, House of York and Tudor periods.  The term may refer to the new aristocracy, or the enriched gentry. It is used by some historians when referring to middle class professionals who held important positions in government, most notably during the reign of Henry VII.

In the late Middle Ages social mobility was not generally seen as a good thing, and could be regarded as dangerous to the social order. There had always been social mobility, as the economy expanded continuously, but much of it was in the church, which was more acceptable. In the 15th century the heavy losses from the Wars of the Roses at the top of society, followed in the 16th by much more rapid economic growth and the English Reformation, after which fewer clergy worked in administrative roles, and which liberated in the Dissolution of the Monasteries vast quantities of assets for the agile nobility and gentry to acquire, all worked to greatly increase upwards mobility at the top of society.

Administrators
These new men were most usually lawyers, clerics and financial administrators who had come to the notice of the King and had been granted ministerial positions because of their own skills rather than because of a noble background.  Common examples of new men are John Morton, Richard Foxe and Reginald Bray. Cardinal Thomas Wolsey could be considered a new man, although by the time of his rise to power new men were not so new and were in fact becoming the norm within government.

New men were first used in order to ensure the aristocracy were not allowed to become over-mighty by giving positions to people with little money, land or influence. This was in many respects a success - as it increased efficiency within government by the use of competent ministers and  moved away from the previous policy bias towards the nobility. However, many new men used the influence they gained to secure new lands and great wealth and were essentially corrupt.  Men like Edmund Dudley and Richard Empson were resented by both the nobles and the general population for the harsh taxes they collected uncompromisingly. This led to their execution on dubious charges of treason.

The existence of new men has been disputed by several historians, who feel that middle class professionals have always been a part of government throughout British history. Other historians have claimed that the use of new men, rather than being invented by the British Kings, was borrowed from the French monarchs' tendency to use the middle classes to help govern.  However, it is commonly agreed that there was a sudden rise in this type of administrator in government towards the end of the 15th century and this, rather than being a paradigm shift, occurred over a sustained period of time.

See also
 Novus homo, a similar concept in the Roman Republic

Notes

References
Siegel, Paul N., "English Humanism and the New Tudor Aristocracy", Journal of the History of Ideas, Vol. 13, No. 4 (Oct., 1952), pp. 450–468, University of Pennsylvania Press, JSTOR

15th century in England
16th century in England